DTLA Proud is a 501(c)(3) non-profit organization based in and focused on Downtown Los Angeles.

Community Center 
On August 5, 2019, the DTLA Proud Gala raised funds for a new LGBTQ community center in Downtown. The proposed space would contain, when completed, a lounge area and library stocked with LGBTQ literature, an art gallery, and a non-profit incubator.

Annual DTLA Proud Festival 

The DTLA Proud Festival is held annually in Pershing Square.

DTLA Proud Festival 2016 
The inaugural DTLA Proud festival was held in August 2016.

DTLA Proud Festival 2017 
After attendance at the 2016 festival more than doubled the pre-event estimates, the organizers extended and enhanced the 2017 event with live music, DJs, dancers and a micro-waterpark. The 2017 event featured “The Run,” a 30-foot-long wall being created by the Los Angeles Conservancy and the ONE National Gay & Lesbian Archives, showcasing LGBTQ icons and listing notable sites in Los Angeles.

DTLA Proud Festival 2018 
2018's festival included a “Pride in the Sky” awards event at the OUE Skyspace at the U.S. Bank Tower

DTLA Proud Festival 2019 
To commemorate the fiftieth anniversary of the Stonewall riots, the 2019 DTLA Proud Festival included a memorial prepared by the ONE National Gay & Lesbian Archives.

DTLA Proud Festival 2020 
The COVID-19 pandemic forced the organization to cancel the 2020 DTLA Proud Festival.

DTLA Proud Festival 2021 
The DTLA Proud Festival was held in 2021 with COVID-19 precautions, such as requiring proof of vaccination.

References

External links

 https://www.dtlaproud.org/

Annual events in Los Angeles County, California
Festivals in Los Angeles
LGBT culture in Los Angeles
LGBT events in California
Pride parades in California